Egoism (typeset as EGOISM) is an Australian dream pop band from Sydney, New South Wales. The band was formed in 2015, and currently consists of Scout Eastment and Olive Rush. The duo share the roles of vocalists, songwriters and guitarists in the band.

To date, the band have released two EPs − 2017's It's Wearing Off and 2020's On Our Minds − as well as several singles.

History
Before the formation of Egoism, Rush and Eastment were close friends. In 2015, Eastment and Rush began writing and playing music together. The band initially formed as a four-piece under the name Ego, releasing three singles: "Moon," "Better" and "Crowd." They supported bands such as Last Dinosaurs, Flyying Colours and Phantastic Ferniture in 2016. 2016 also saw the band officially change their name to Egoism and release their first single under the new name, "Reason."

Their debut EP was a three-track release entitled It's Wearing Off. The group have largely disowned the EP in recent years, and it has subsequently been removed from streaming services. In an interview with Pilerats, Eastment explained the duo's complicated relationship with the release:

After the departure of two band members, Egoism were turned into a duo. Their first single as a two-piece, "Sorry," was released in September 2018. This was followed with two new singles in 2019: "Enemies" in March, and "What Are We Doing?" in August.

The band undertook a national tour with Pinkish Blu in early 2020, coinciding with the release of a new single entitled "You You."

In June 2020, the band were announced as one of 16 recipients of triple j Unearthed's Level Up Grants, created by the station to "support independent local artists who had been impacted by the COVID-19 pandemic."

In September 2020, the band announced their second EP On Our Minds with the release of a new single, "Here's the Thing." They released a final single from the EP, "Happy," before its official release on November 6, 2020.

Discography

EPs
 It's Wearing Off (2017)
 On Our Minds (2020)

Singles
 "Moon" (2015)
 "Better" (2015)
 "Crowd" (2016)
 "Reason" (2016)
 "Sorry" (2018)
 "Enemies" (2019)
 "What Are We Doing?" (2019)
 "You You" (2020)
 "Here's the Thing" (2020)
 "Happy" (2020)
 "Lonely But Not Alone" (2021)
 "For Ages" (2022)

References

External links
 Official Facebook Page

2015 establishments in Australia
Musical groups established in 2015